The 1991 European Masters League was a  professional non-ranking snooker tournament, which took place between 30 May and 28 June 1991. Held on just one occasion, four players participated and it was won by Steve Davis, who claimed the first title of the 1991-92 snooker season.


Results

 Steve Davis 5–3 James Wattana
 Tony Drago 5–3 Jimmy White
 Steve Davis 6–2 Tony Drago
 Steve Davis 6–2 Jimmy White
 James Wattana 7–1 Jimmy White
 James Wattana 5–3 Tony Drago

References

1991 in snooker